Myelodes is a genus of snout moths described by George Hampson in 1930.

Species
 Myelodes flavimargo Hampson, 1930
 Myelodes jansei Hampson, 1930

References

Phycitinae